Elassoctenus is a genus of spiders in the family Miturgidae. It was first described in 1909 by Simon. , it contains only one species, Elassoctenus harpax, found in western Australia.

References

Miturgidae
Monotypic Araneomorphae genera
Spiders of Australia